Pteracantha is a genus of beetles in the family Cerambycidae, containing the following species:

 Pteracantha agrestis Monné & Monné, 2002
 Pteracantha fasciata Newman, 1838

References

Trachyderini
Cerambycidae genera